Mount Arthur Meighen is a  mountain located in the Premier Range of the Cariboo Mountains in the east-central interior of British Columbia, Canada.  The mountain is south of the head of the McLennan River and immediately west of the town of Valemount, British Columbia.

The name honours the ninth Prime Minister of Canada, Arthur Meighen, who held office for only fifteen months in 1920-1921 and three months in 1926. He died in 1960, thirty-six years after leaving office. The mountain was officially renamed after Meighen in 1962.  Prior to that, it had been called "Carpé".

Climate
Based on the Köppen climate classification, the mountain is located in a subarctic climate zone with cold, snowy winters, and mild summers. Temperatures in winter can drop below −20 °C with wind chill factors below −30 °C.

References

External links
 
 British Columbia Government Information Sheet for Mount Arthur Meighen

Robson Valley
Three-thousanders of British Columbia
Cariboo Mountains
Cariboo Land District